Marián Havlíček (19 April 1953 in Zvolen – 30 December 1972 on Prašivá (a mountain in Low Tatras)) was a Czechoslovak slalom canoeist who competed in the early 1970s. He finished sixth in the K-1 event at the 1972 Summer Olympics in Munich.

References
 Sports-reference.com profile

1953 births
1972 deaths
Canoeists at the 1972 Summer Olympics
Czechoslovak male canoeists
Slovak male canoeists
Olympic canoeists of Czechoslovakia
Sportspeople from Zvolen